The 1965 Copa Libertadores de América was the sixth edition of South America's premier club football tournament. Colombia did not send a representative due to the disagreements between CONMEBOL and the Colombian football federation. This will become the last edition in which only the national champions of each association may participate.

After the victorious campaign the previous year, Independiente will go on to successfully defend the title after beating another Uruguayan team, this time Peñarol. Independiente begun a legacy that saw it become a world class football team and this paved the way for future conquests to come.

Qualified teams

Tie-breaking criteria
The format of the competition remained nearly the same as the previous year's edition; the preliminary round was eliminated from this edition.

At each stage of the tournament teams receive 2 points for a win, 1 point for a draw, and no points for a loss. If two or more teams are equal on points, the following criteria will be applied to determine the ranking in the group stage:

a one-game playoff;
superior goal difference;
draw of lots.

First round
Nine teams were drawn into three groups. In each group, teams played against each other home-and-away. The top team in each group advanced to the Semifinals. Independiente, the title holders, had a bye to the next round.

Group 1

Group 2

Group 3

Semifinals
Four teams were drawn into two groups. In each group, teams played against each other home-and-away. The top team in each group advanced to the Finals.

Group A

Independiente progressed to the finals due to better goal difference.

Group B

Finals

Champion

Top goalscorers

Footnotes

A.  Points were taken from Deportivo Galicia due to irregularities in their line-up. Peñarol was awarded the points. Peñarol advanced due to goal difference.

External links
Copa Libertadores 1965 at CONMEBOL website
Copa Libertadores 1965 at RSSSF

1
Copa Libertadores seasons